Naalu Policeum Nalla Irundha Oorum is a 2015 Indian Tamil-language comedy film written and directed by Srikrishna. The film stars Arulnithi and Remya Nambeesan while Bagavathi Perumal, Singampuli, Rajkumar, and Yogi Babu play supporting roles. The film was highly panned by critics for its poor story and screenplay. The movie failed to perform well at the box office. It is loosely based on the British film Ask a Policeman (1939) and the Swedish film Kopps (2003).

Plot 
The film starts with an outsider coming to the village to provide invitations to the people there. There is a police station with one sub-inspector Chelladurai (Bagavathi Perumal) and three constables. The village is winning the award from the president (Thirumurugan) for being a model village. People are very honest and hardworking, and there are no problems in the village. The policemen lead a very peaceful life because of the villagers. They work from 9 to 5 and are closed on Sundays. The police station is used for playing board games and watching TV along with the villagers. Constable Shanmugapandian (Arulnithi) is a daydreamer and has a liking to a schoolteacher named Subha (Remya Nambeesan). However, he is unable to propose to her. Since the village is clean without any crimes, the higher officials plan to transfer them to another village known for riots. Saddened by this, the four policemen create trouble for the villagers. Padhinettam Pandiyan (Singampuli) and Chelladurai ask a favor from a thief (Yogi Babu) to steal things so they can file a case, but all their attempts fail. How their actions cause change among the villagers and their lives is the rest of the film.

Cast

Production 
The film was first reported in July 2013, when Leo Visions announced that newcomer director Srikrishna would make a film starring Arulnithi in the lead role.

Arulnithi began filming for the project in December 2013 and revealed he played a day-dreaming cop constantly brought back to reality by his superior, adding that it will be his first comedy film.

Arulnithi leads a four-man police team composing of Singampuli and actors Bagavathi Perumal and Rajkumar, who had starred in the production house's first venture Naduvula Konjam Pakkatha Kaanom (2012). Ramya Nambeesan plays Arulnithi's love interest in the film.

The team shot fight sequences at Binny Mills, Chennai in February 2014.

Track list 

Movie songs and background score was composed by B. R. Rejin.

The movie featured three songs as below,

"Enna Nadakuthu Ethu Nadakuthu" – Harihara Sudhan

"Kadhal Kani Rasam" (Remix) – Mohamed Aslam, Nincy

"Kadhal Kani Rasam" – M. M. Madhu, JSK Shruthi

Release and reception 
Sify said, "Naalu Policeum Nalla Iruntha Oorum is yet another film where the core story is unique and novel but the execution falls short."

References

External links 
 

2015 films
2010s Tamil-language films
Indian comedy films
Indian remakes of British films
2015 comedy films